The Montenegro national under-19 football team is the national under-19 football team of Montenegro and is controlled by the Football Association of Montenegro.  The team competes in the European Under-19 Football Championship, held every year.

Competitive Record

UEFA European Under-19 Championship
UEFA European U-19 Championship Record as follows:

* Draws include knockout matches decided by penalty shootout.

Recent results

Current squad
 The following players were called up for the friendly match.
 Match dates: 5 June 2022
 Opposition: Caps and goals correct as of:''' 12 May 2022, after the match against

References

External links
 Football Association of Montenegro 
 JadranSport.org - South-Eastern European football news coverage 
 UEFA.com (Montenegro) 

Under-19
European national under-19 association football teams